The 2009–10 Appalachian State Mountaineers men's basketball team represented Appalachian State University in the 2009–10 NCAA Division I men's basketball season. The Mountaineers were led by head coach Buzz Peterson in his first year leading the team in his second stint as Appalachian State's head coach after returning to the team in April of 2009. Appalachian State played their home games at the George M. Holmes Convocation Center in Boone, North Carolina, as members of the Southern Conference. 

The Mountaineers finished conference play with a 13–5 record and won the Southern Conference's North division. In the SoCon tournament, Appalachian State won two games to advance to the SoCon championship game, where they were defeated by South division champion Wofford.

Appalachian State failed to qualify for the NCAA tournament, but were invited to the 2010 CollegeInsider.com Postseason Tournament.

The Mountaineers finished the season with a 24–13 record.

Roster 

Source

Schedule and results

|-
!colspan=9 style=|Exhibition

|-
!colspan=9 style=|Regular season

|-
!colspan=9 style=| SoCon tournament

|-
!colspan=9 style=| CollegeInsider.com tournament

References

Appalachian State Mountaineers men's basketball seasons
Appalachian State
Appalachian State
Appalachian State men's basketball
Appalachian State men's basketball